Germany at the European Athletics Championships participated at the first two editions (1934 and 1938) and, after the Fall of the Berlin Wall, from 1994 at all editions of the European Athletics Championships.

Medal count

See also
 German Athletics Association
 Germany at the World Athletics Championships
 Germany at the European Athletics Team Championships

References

External links
 European Athletic Association

Athletics in Germany
Nations at the European Athletics Championships
European Athletics Team